The 1987 Bolton Metropolitan Borough Council election took place on 7 May 1987 to elect members of Bolton Metropolitan Borough Council in Greater Manchester, England. One third of the council was up for election and the Labour Party kept overall control of the council.

20 seats were contested in the election: 13 were won by the Labour Party, 6 by the Conservative Party, and 1 by the Liberal Party. After the election, the composition of the council was:
Labour 38
Conservative 16
Liberal Party 5
Social Democratic Party 1

Election result

Council Composition
Prior to the election the composition of the council was:

After the election the composition of the council was:

LD – Liberal / SDP Alliance

Ward results

Astley Bridge ward

Blackrod ward

Bradshaw ward

Breightmet ward

Bromley Cross ward

Burnden ward

Central ward

Daubhill ward

Deane-cum-Heaton ward

Derby ward

Farnworth ward

Halliwell ward

Harper Green ward

Horwich ward

Hulton Park ward

Kearsley ward

Little Lever ward

Smithills ward

Tonge ward

Westhoughton ward

References

 

1987
1987 English local elections
1980s in Greater Manchester